Kim Busch (born 16 June 1998) is a Dutch competitive swimmer who specializes in freestyle and butterfly. As a member of the Dutch freestyle relay team she won silver in the 4×50 m event during the 2016 Short Course World Championships, and bronze in the 4×100 m event during the 2017 World Championships.

Personal bests

References

External links
 

1998 births
Living people
Dutch female butterfly swimmers
Dutch female freestyle swimmers
Swimmers at the 2014 Summer Youth Olympics
World Aquatics Championships medalists in swimming
European Aquatics Championships medalists in swimming
European Championships (multi-sport event) silver medalists
Swimmers at the 2020 Summer Olympics
Olympic swimmers of the Netherlands
Medalists at the FINA World Swimming Championships (25 m)
21st-century Dutch women
Sportspeople from Dordrecht